Víctor Alberto Salazar Cuesta (born February 14, 1991) is a Colombian professional footballer who plays as a forward.

Career
Salazar is a product of the Millonarios youth system and played with the Millonarios first-team since March, 2009.

References

External links

1991 births
Living people
People from Quibdó
Colombian footballers
Association football forwards
Colombian expatriate footballers
Expatriate soccer players in South Africa
Expatriate footballers in Slovakia
Colombian expatriate sportspeople in South Africa
Colombian expatriate sportspeople in Slovakia
Categoría Primera A players
Categoría Primera B players
National First Division players
2. Liga (Slovakia) players
Millonarios F.C. players
Atlético F.C. footballers
Atlético Huila footballers
Atlético Bucaramanga footballers
Royal Eagles F.C. players
FK Senica players
AFC Nové Mesto nad Váhom players
Sportspeople from Chocó Department